Ekaterina Vasilieva may refer to:

Ekaterina Aleksandrovna Vasilieva (born 1976), water polo player
 Ekaterina Vasilieva (figure skater) (born 1986), Russian pair skater
Yekaterina Vasilyeva (born 1945), Russian actress
 Ekaterina Vasilyeva (19th-century actress)(1829–1877), Russian actress